Southend United F.C. played the season 2013–14 in the fourth tier of English football, League Two.

Review and events 

On 19 June 2013, their fixture list was released and it was confirmed that they would play Plymouth Argyle F.C. on the opening weekend.

Competitions

League Two

League table

Matches

FA Cup

Football League Cup

Football League Trophy

References

Southend United F.C. seasons
Southend United